State Road 66 (SR 66) is a 25-mile-long east–west state highway in Hardee County and Highlands County. Its western terminus is an intersection with US 17 (SR 35) in Zolfo Springs; the eastern terminus is an intersection with  US 27-98 (SR 25-700) near DeSoto City. The eastern continuation of SR 66 is eastbound US 98-SR 700 toward Okeechobee and West Palm Beach.

State Road 66 snakes through farmlands, woodlands, and wetlands in a sparsely populated region of southern Florida.  Near Crewsville, SR 66 provides access (via South Hammock Road, Washington Road, and Hammock Road) to Highlands Hammock State Park. It is part of what's known as the Florida Cracker Trail.

Major intersections

References

External links

Florida Route Log (SR 66)

066
066
066